The A2 motorway is a motorway in the Netherlands. It is one of the busiest highways in the Netherlands. The road connects the city of Amsterdam, near the Amstel interchange with the Belgian border, near Maastricht (NL) and Liège (B), and the Belgian A25 road.

The route of the A2 motorway is shared with two major European routes. Between its start, at Amstel Interchange, near Amsterdam, and the Interchange Oudenrijn, near Utrecht, European route E35 follows the A2 motorway. From the Oudenrijn Interchange towards the Belgian border just south of Maastricht, European route E25 follows the route of the A2. Local and express lanes on A2 have different speed limits. The speed limit on express lanes is 120 km/h (75 mph) and locals is 100 km/h (63 mph).

Route description

Road N2 
In the past, the motorway A2 was interrupted at one location, near Maastricht. This section was referred to as N2, to make a distinction between the motorway (A2) and the non-motorway (N2).

The N2 through Maastricht 
Until recently, the motorway A2 was interrupted between the interchanges Kruisdonk and Europaplein through Maastricht. This road section was built as a highway (N2) with several at-grade intersections with traffic lights. In December 2016 the Koning Willem-Alexandertunnel was opened to traffic, a 4-lane tunnel built in two layers, which put an end to this situation.

The N2 around Eindhoven 
The beltway around the city of Eindhoven, the so-called Randweg between the interchanges Ekkersweijer and Leenderheide, uses a system of local-express lanes. The outer two lanes are used by vehicles to and from Eindhoven and the neighbouring towns. These outer lanes have road number N2, to distinguish the local lanes from the express lanes.

History

Other reconstruction projects 

The A2 motorway was subject to multiple reconstruction projects. Next to the project around Eindhoven, as described above, the A2 was being rebuilt at the following locations:

Amsterdam - Utrecht 
Between interchanges Holendrecht and Oudenrijn, the road has been widened from six (2x3) to ten (2x5) lanes. It has enough space to expand the road to fourteen (2x7) lanes. Near the city of Utrecht, a system of local-express lanes has been applied, with the inner three lanes serving express traffic, and the outer two lanes serving local traffic. Unlike the situation near Eindhoven, the motorway status is maintained for local lanes, which means that all ten lanes will keep the name A2.

Between 1954 and 1986, a level crossing operated on the motorway.

Utrecht - 's-Hertogenbosch 
Between interchanges Oudenrijn and Everdingen, the A2 was expanded to 2x4 lanes. Between interchanges Everdingen and Deil, the road is widened from four (2x2) to eight lanes (2x4); the section between interchanges Deil and Empel was expanded from four to six lanes.

's-Hertogenbosch beltway 
The A2 around the city of 's-Hertogenbosch was rebuilt similarly to the future situation near Utrecht. However, there are only just four express lanes, instead of the six near Utrecht, so the road has 4x2 lanes.

's-Hertogenbosch - Eindhoven 
Since both the 's-Hertogenbosch and Eindhoven beltways were finished in 2009, a new bottleneck appeared between both cities. The motorway has only 2x2 lanes while both beltways are having twice the capacity. Construction of expanding this section to 2x3 lanes started on December 13, 2011.

Exit list

References 

Motorways in the Netherlands
Motorways in Gelderland
Motorways in Limburg (Netherlands)
Motorways in North Brabant
Motorways in North Holland
Motorways in Utrecht (province)
South Limburg (Netherlands)
Transport in Amsterdam
Transport in Eindhoven
Transport in 's-Hertogenbosch
Transport in Maastricht
Transport in Sittard-Geleen
Transport in Utrecht (city)
Transport in Weert